Trevon De'Sean Diggs (born September 20, 1998) is an American football cornerback for the Dallas Cowboys of the National Football League (NFL).  He played college football at Alabama and was drafted by the Cowboys in the second round of the 2020 NFL Draft.

Early years
Diggs initially attended Thomas S. Wootton High School in Rockville, Maryland. After his sophomore year, he decided to transfer to The Avalon School in Wheaton, Maryland, to follow his football coach Tyree Spinner.

He played defensive back and wide receiver in high school. As a junior, he tallied 78 receptions for 1,008 yards and 15 touchdowns. As a senior, he had 1,269 receiving yards. He was a two-time All-Washington D.C. Metro selection at receiver. He committed to the University of Alabama to play college football.

College career
As a true freshman at Alabama in 2016, Diggs played safety, wide receiver, and was a return specialist. He finished the year with five tackles and one forced fumble on defense, 11 receptions for 88 yards and a touchdown on offense and had 296 total return yards on special teams.

As a sophomore in 2017, Diggs switched to cornerback full-time. He was a starter for the season opener against Florida State, before being passed on the depth chart by Levi Wallace. He posted six tackles and three passes defended. He also played on special teams, returning 18 punts for 154 yards with a long of 21 yards, and two kickoffs for 74 yards.

As a junior in 2018, Diggs started the first six games of the season, before being lost for the year with a broken foot he suffered against Arkansas. He finished the year with 20 tackles and an interception.

As a senior in 2019, he started 12 games, while registering 37 tackles, three interceptions (tied for second on the team), eight passes defensed (tied for the team lead) and two fumble recoveries, including a 100-yard touchdown return against Tennessee. He returned an interception for an 84-yard touchdown, recovered two fumbles (one for a touchdown) and had 100-plus combined return yards against Arkansas. He had a career-high 10 tackles against LSU.

Professional career

Diggs was selected by the Dallas Cowboys in the second round (51st overall) of the 2020 NFL Draft.

2020

Diggs was named the starter at right cornerback, helping fill the void left by Byron Jones's departure in free agency. In Week 3 against the Seattle Seahawks, Diggs forced a fumble on DK Metcalf at the goal line and the ball broke the plane of the endzone and went out of bounds, resulting in a touchback.  Diggs was able to force the fumble after Metcalf slowed down and held the ball out with one hand near the goal line.
In Week 4 against the Cleveland Browns, Diggs recorded his first career sack on Baker Mayfield during the 49–38 loss. In Week 8 against the Philadelphia Eagles on Sunday Night Football, Diggs recorded his first two career interceptions off of passes thrown by Carson Wentz during the 23–9 loss. He suffered a fractured bone in his foot in Week 9 and was placed on injured reserve on November 18, 2020. On December 19, 2020, Diggs was activated off of injured reserve. He started 11 out of 12 games, playing through knee and shoulder injuries, as part of a defensive unit that struggled during the season. He had 56 tackles (sixth on the team), 3 interceptions (led the team), 14 passes defensed (led the team), one sack and one forced fumble.

2021
Diggs was named the starter at left cornerback. He scored his first career touchdown off an interception thrown by Philadelphia Eagles quarterback Jalen Hurts during a Week 3 victory. Diggs was awarded the NFC Defensive Player of the Month for September. In Week 4, Diggs had four tackles and two interceptions in a 36–28 win over the Carolina Panthers, earning NFC Defensive Player of the Week honors. In Week 6, Diggs had his second touchdown off an interception thrown by New England Patriots quarterback Mac Jones, giving Dallas a late 26–21 lead. Diggs tied an NFL record for most consecutive games with an interception to start a season with six games (Brian Russell in 2003). Diggs also joined Hall of Famer Rod Woodson in recording seven interceptions in the first six games of a season. Diggs recorded his 11th interception of the season against the Washington Football Team on December 26, tying the Cowboys single-season record held by Everson Walls (1981). Overall, Diggs finished the 2021 season with a league-leading 11 interceptions, which was also the highest single-season mark by any NFL player since Walls in 1981. He also registered 56 tackles (seventh on the team) and 21 passes defensed (led the team). His breakout season earned him First Team All-Pro recognition.

NFL career statistics

Regular season

Postseason

Personal life
Diggs has two brothers: Darez (born 1995) and Stefon (born 1993). Stefon Diggs played for Our Lady of Good Counsel in Olney, Maryland while Darez Diggs played for Friendship Collegiate Academy Public Charter School in Washington, DC.  Darez played for the UAB Blazers and the Morgan State Bears while Stefon, a wide receiver, currently plays for the Buffalo Bills.

Diggs's father Aron died in January 2008 at the age of 39 due to congestive heart failure. Trevon has a son, Aaiden (born 2016).

References

External links
Dallas Cowboys bio
Alabama Crimson Tide bio

1998 births
Living people
Alabama Crimson Tide football players
American football cornerbacks
People from Gaithersburg, Maryland
Players of American football from Maryland
Sportspeople from Montgomery County, Maryland
Dallas Cowboys players
National Conference Pro Bowl players